Football Club Chikhura Sachkhere, commonly known as Chikhura Sachkhere or simply Chikhura, is a Georgian football club based in Sachkhere. 

They compete in Liga 3, the third tier of Georgian league system.

History
Founded in 1938, during World War II the club was disbanded, but later they resumed participation in low leagues of the republican championship. 

Since 2002 Chikhura has been financed by the Georgian businessman Bidzina Ivanishvili. 

The club spent many years in lower divisions before getting promoted to Umaglesi Liga in 2012. The league gained a stable and decent member, known as a tough rival for championship title candidates. From the outset the club proved they were going to challenge the best teams. In 2013 Chikhura knocked out top flight sides Shukura, Dila and Sioni and reached David Kipiani Cup final. Despite the defeat from Dinamo Tbilisi, they qualified for the 2013–14 UEFA Europa League 1st round. This was the first season that Chikhura Sachkhere appeared in European Competition with their first opponent being Liechtenstein's Cup Winners Vaduz. 

From now until 2020 the club started regularly taking part in UEFA Europa league competitions, missing out just one season in between. In almost each case this provincial team with relatively negligent financial resources, which played their matches mostly in far-away Tbilisi, could afford to show a fighting spirit against their far stronger opponents. In this regard Chikhura drew attention and respect from Georgian fans during the European campaign regardless of who they supported in the domestic league. According to the statistics, the club achieved better results in away games.

In 2014 Chikhura eliminated Turkish club Bursaspor in the second round of Europa League competition.  This remains one of the most memorable successes in the club's history.

In 2016 Chikhura won White Group of the league by finishing six points clear of Dinamo Tbilisi and took part in championship play-offs, where they were beaten by Samtredia. This was the closest point to champion's title the club have ever reached in their history.             

The next season Chikhura finally reaped the fruits of their efforts. After reaching the finals or semifinals of the Cup for five successive seasons, they clinched their first title. Goalkeeper Dino Hamzić, who did not concede a single goal during the entire campaign, was named man of the match.

Giorgi Gabedava became another player, who was awarded following the 2018 season. He won in four nominations, including as the best striker of the season and top scorer with the latter shared with Budu Zivzivadze. In the summer the club made headlines yet again, this time after their victory over Beitar Jerusalem and a home draw with Maribor Ljubljana. 

2019 marked the beginning of the crisis. While thrashed by Aberdeen in Europa league, Chikhura failed to achieve anything noteworthy either in Erovnuli Liga or the Cup and with several key players departed, head coach Samson Pruidze left the club. The former Torpedo Kutaisi right-back had trained Chikhura for twelve seasons, an absolute record in national football history since the independence, which made him a legend among this generation of Georgian managers.

In 2020 Chikhura played all home games in Tbilisi and in the worst result in years finished in the drop-zone. Although the club avoided an automatic relegation, they suffered a defeat in both play-off games from in-form Samgurali. Following this season defender Shota Kashia, who had spent eight seasons in Chikhura, including last six years as a captain, parted ways with the club.     

Chikhura's woes stretched into the next two years, when they ended up at rock bottom of both second and third leagues. However, after the 2022 season the club avoided relegation due to disqualification of another team from Liga 3.

Statistics

Domestic
{|class="wikitable"
|-bgcolor="#efefef"
! Season
! Div.
! Pos.
! Pl.
! W
! D
! L
! GF
! GA
! P
! Cup
! Europe
! Notes
! Manager
|-
|1993–94
|bgcolor=#ffa07a|2nd West
|align=right  bgcolor=#FFBBBB|13
|align=right|26||align=right|3||align=right|2||align=right|21
|align=right|16||align=right|70||align=right|11
|
|
| bgcolor=#FFBBBB|Relegated
|
|-
|1995–96
|bgcolor=#ffa07a|2nd West
|align=right  bgcolor=#FFBBBB|19
|align=right|38||align=right|10||align=right|3||align=right|25
|align=right|62||align=right|124||align=right|33
|
|
| bgcolor=#FFBBBB|Relegated
|
|-
|2001–02
|bgcolor=#98bb98|3rd West
|align=right|
|align=right| ||align=right| ||align=right| ||align=right| 
|align=right| ||align=right| ||align=right| 
|
|
|
|
|-
|2002–03
|bgcolor=#98bb98|3rd West
|align=right|
|align=right| ||align=right| ||align=right| ||align=right| 
|align=right| ||align=right| ||align=right| 
|
|
|bgcolor=#ccffcc|Promoted
|
|-
|2003–04
|bgcolor=#ffa07a|2nd
|align=right|6
|align=right| 30||align=right| 15||align=right| 5||align=right| 10
|align=right| 41||align=right| 29||align=right| 50
|Round of 32
|
|
|
|-
|2004–05
|bgcolor=#ffa07a|2nd
|align=right|8
|align=right| 30||align=right| 12||align=right| 7||align=right| 11
|align=right| 38||align=right| 35||align=right| 43
|Round of 32
|
|
|
|-
|2005–06
|bgcolor=#ffa07a|2nd
|align=right bgcolor=gold|1
|align=right| 34||align=right| 24||align=right| 6||align=right| 4
|align=right| 87||align=right| 34||align=right| 78
|Round of 16
|
|bgcolor=#ccffcc|Promoted
|
|-
|2006–07
|1st
|align=right  bgcolor=#FFBBBB|12
|align=right|26||align=right|5||align=right|6||align=right|15
|align=right|13||align=right|46||align=right|21
|Quarter-finals
|
| bgcolor=#FFBBBB|Relegated
|
|-
|2007–08
|bgcolor=#ffa07a|2nd East
|align=right|5
|align=right| 27||align=right| 12||align=right| 7||align=right| 8
|align=right| 40||align=right| 37||align=right| 43
|Round of 32
|
|
|
|-
|2008–09
|bgcolor=#ffa07a|2nd East
|align=right bgcolor=silver|2
|align=right| 30||align=right| 19||align=right| 7||align=right| 4
|align=right| 56||align=right| 21||align=right| 64
|Round of 16
|
|
|Samson Pruidze
|-
|2009–10
|bgcolor=#ffa07a|2nd
|align=right|6
|align=right|28||align=right|14||align=right|7||align=right|7
|align=right|41||align=right|28||align=right|49
|Quarter-finals
|
|
|Samson Pruidze
|-
|2010–11
|bgcolor=#ffa07a|2nd
|align=right|4
|align=right|32||align=right|20||align=right|6||align=right|6
|align=right|58||align=right|25||align=right|66
|Round of 16
|
|promotion play-off, lost
|Samson Pruidze
|-
|2011–12
|bgcolor=#ffa07a|2nd
|align=right bgcolor=gold|1
|align=right|14 ||align=right|8 ||align=right|2 ||align=right| 4
|align=right|25 ||align=right|15 ||align=right| 26
|Round of 16
|
|bgcolor=#ccffcc|Promoted
|Samson Pruidze
|-
|2012–13
|1st
|align=right|4
|align=right|32 ||align=right|17 ||align=right|6 ||align=right|9
|align=right|49 ||align=right|38 ||align=right|57
|bgcolor=silver|Runner-up
|
|
|Samson Pruidze
|-
|2013–14
|1st
|align=right|4
|align=right|32 ||align=right|13 ||align=right|7 ||align=right|12
|align=right|56 ||align=right|50 ||align=right|46
|bgcolor=silver|Runner-up
|Europa League 2nd QR
|
|Samson Pruidze
|-
|2014–15
|1st
|align=right|5
|align=right|30 ||align=right|13 ||align=right|7 ||align=right|10
|align=right|39 ||align=right|36 ||align=right|46
|bgcolor=cc9966|Semi-finals
|Europa League 3rd QR
|
|Samson Pruidze
|-
|-
|2015–16
|1st
|align=right|4
|align=right|30 ||align=right|17 ||align=right|6 ||align=right|7
|align=right|53 ||align=right|26 ||align=right|57
|bgcolor=cc9966|Semi-finals
|
|
|Samson Pruidze
|-
|2016
|1st
|align=right bgcolor=silver|2
|align=right|14 ||align=right|9 ||align=right|3 ||align=right|2
|align=right|29 ||align=right|15 ||align=right|30
|bgcolor=cc9966|Semi-finals
|Europa League 1st QR
|
|Samson Pruidze
|-
|2017
|1st
|align=right|5
|align=right|36 ||align=right|17 ||align=right|4 ||align=right|15
|align=right|47 ||align=right|54 ||align=right|55
|bgcolor=gold|Winner
|Europa League 1st QR
|
|Samson Pruidze
|-
|2018
|1st
|align=right|4
|align=right|36 ||align=right|19 ||align=right|7 ||align=right|10
|align=right|54 ||align=right|33 ||align=right|64
|Round of 16
|Europa League 2nd QR
|
|Samson Pruidze
|-
|2019
|1st
|align=right|5
|align=right|36 ||align=right|12 ||align=right|11 ||align=right|13
|align=right|48 ||align=right|44 ||align=right|47
|Round of 16
|Europa League 2nd QR
|
|Samson Pruidze
|-
|2020
|1st
|align=right  bgcolor=#FFBBBB|9
|align=right|18 ||align=right|3 ||align=right|4 ||align=right|11
|align=right|18 ||align=right|40 ||align=right|13
|bgcolor=cc9966|Semi-finals
|
| bgcolor=#FFBBBB|Play-off, relegated
|Vakhtang Turmanidze
|-
|2021
|bgcolor=#ffa07a|2nd
|align=right  bgcolor=#FFBBBB|10
|align=right|36 ||align=right|2 ||align=right|4 ||align=right|30
|align=right|24 ||align=right|98 ||align=right|10
|Round of 16
|
| bgcolor=#FFBBBB |Relegated
|Vakhtang Turmanidze, Mirian Mikadze
|-
|2022
|bgcolor=#98bb98|3rd
|align=right  bgcolor=#FFBBBB|16
|align=right|30 ||align=right|0 ||align=right|1 ||align=right|29
|align=right|19 ||align=right|119 ||align=right|1
|Second round
|
|
|Vladimer Zabakhidze
|}

European competitions

Notes

Honours
 Erovnuli Liga
 Runners-up (1): 2016

 Georgian Cup Winners (1): 2017
 Runners-up (2): 2012-13 and 2013-14

 Georgian Super Cup Winners (1): 2013

 Pirveli Liga Winners (2):' 2005-06 and 2011-12

Players

 

Stadium
The team's home ground is the 2,000-seat Central stadium, although in recent years they played home games at Ivantsminda stadium, situated in six km from the district center. 

Name
The club have had different names throughout their history, including "Spartaki", "Kolmeurne", "Peikari". Chikhura'' is the name of a river in Sachkhere.

References

External links
Official site
Uefa.com
Fifa.com

Chikhura Sachkhere
1938 establishments in Georgia (country)
Association football clubs established in 1938